A bulk box, also known as a bulk bin, skid box, pallet box, bin box, gaylord, or octabin  is a pallet-size box used for storage and shipping of bulk quantities.

In the U.S. and Canada, the term gaylord is sometimes used for triplewall corrugated pallet boxes; this is due to the first bulk bins being manufactured by the original Gaylord Container Company of St. Louis, which was acquired by Crown Zellerbach of San Francisco in 1955.

Construction

Bulk boxes are often made of corrugated fiberboard, either doublewall or triplewall. Many corrugated bulk boxes have covers.  The main body of some is similar to a half slotted container with flaps on the bottom; others have a separate base (similar to the cover) and a sleeve for side walls.  Additional corrugated liners and box reinforcement are sometimes used to control bulging.
  
Wooden boxes are also used for bulk packaging;  boxes made of aluminum and steel are common in heavy industry. Reusable plastic totes (molded or corrugated plastic) are used for some products and logistics chains.

For some products, inner plastic liners or bin bags are used to protect the contents. Sealed inner bags with integral valves are sometimes used for liquids.  Most bulk boxes are recyclable, returnable, or reusable.  Some styles of boxes fold (knock down) or come apart for easier return shipments.

Use

Bulk boxes are  used for loose parts, mixed small containers,  granular materials, powders, liquids, etc.   Use in industry is common: shipping and storage of bulk intermediate materials prior to further processing or packaging.  They are sometimes used to collect and ship materials for recycling and waste.

When used to ship hazardous waste or dangerous goods, box construction and use are highly regulated.

ASTM standards
 D5168 Standard Practice for Fabrication and Closure of Triple-wall Corrugated Containers
 D6179 Standard Test Methods for Rough Handling of Unitized Loads and Large Shipping Cases and Crates 
 D6251 Standard Specification for Wood-Cleated Panelboard Shipping Boxes 
 D6254 Standard Specification for Wirebound Pallet-Type Wood Boxes 
 D6256 Standard Specification for Wood-Cleated Shipping Boxes and Skidded, Load-Bearing Bases 
 D6573 Standard Specification for General Purpose Wirebound Shipping Boxes 
 D6880-05 Standard Specification for wooden boxes

See also
Corrugated box design
Intermediate bulk container
Shipping container
Dutch flower bucket

References

Further reading
 McKinlay, A. H. Transport Packaging (2nd ed.). Oakbrook Terrace, Ill.: Institute of Packaging Professionals, 2004, 
 Yam, K. L., Encyclopedia of Packaging Technology, John Wiley & Sons, 2009, 

Containers
Shipping containers